Aftermath is a lost 1914 silent film drama produced by Daniel Frohman and Adolph Zukor. It was released on a State Rights basis.

Plot summary
Young Ruth Morgan, an orphan, decides to leave her small town to make her fortune in the big city. Meanwhile, in another small down, young doctor Allan Buchannan also decides to strike out for the big city. Unfortunately, Ruth falls in love with a rich playboy who soon betrays her, and Allan makes a tragic mistake by accidentally prescribing a drug that results in a child's death. Soon afterwards he learns that his sister has died in a train accident. Despondent and grief-stricken, he walks to a nearby river, intending to end it all by jumping in. There he meets Ruth, who is there for the same purpose.

Cast
 Owen Moore — Allan Buchannan
 Virginia Pearson — Ruth Morgan

References

External links
 Aftermath at IMDb.com

1914 films
American silent feature films
Lost American films
American films based on plays
Famous Players-Lasky films
American black-and-white films
Silent American drama films
1914 drama films
1914 lost films
Lost drama films
1910s American films
1910s English-language films